Tomas Morato Avenue is a street located in Quezon City within the Diliman and New Manila areas of northeastern Metro Manila, Philippines. The street links Eulogio Rodriguez Sr. Avenue in the village of Mariana in the south with Eugenio Lopez Drive (also known as Scout Albano Street) in South Triangle in the north, and passes through Barangays Sacred Heart, Laging Handa, Kamuning, Obrero, and Kristong Hari. It was named after the first mayor of Quezon City.

The street is known as a trendy restaurant row located in Quezon City's entertainment area along with Timog Avenue and West Avenue. It is also known for its bars, discos, karaoke and comedy clubs, and as a popular hangout for local actors who work in the nearby studios such as the ABS-CBN Broadcasting Center on Mother Ignacia Avenue and GMA Network Center on Timog Avenue corner EDSA, as well as millennials.

Route description 
Tomas Morato Avenue runs in a north–south direction and has four lanes, two lanes going in each direction. Beginning at the intersection with Eulogio Rodriguez Sr. Avenue in New Manila, the road traverses barangay Kristong Hari and quickly enters the barangays Obrero and Kamuning in the district of Diliman towards the junction with Kamuning Road. Upon crossing the Don Alejandro Roces Avenue (former Calle Retiro), it enters the Scout areas, home to most of the street's famous restaurants and bars, where the road serves as the border between barangays Laging Handa and Sacred Heart up to the intersection with Timog Avenue. The streets in this area were named in honor of the 22 Boy Scouts who died in a plane crash en route to joining the 11th World Scout Jamboree. A memorial stands at the center of the rotunda at the intersection of Tomas Morato with Timog Avenue. Near the Scouting memorial is the location of the former Ozone disco. Past the memorial rotunda, the avenue enters barangay South Triangle, where it then ends at a T-intersection with Eugenio Lopez Drive by the ELJ Communications Center.

History 
The street, which opened around 1940, was originally named Sampaloc Avenue. It was so named because of the prevalence of tamarind (sampaloc) trees which lined the street in the early days. It is believed that the trees were planted by Tomas Morato himself along with President Manuel Luis Quezon and journalist Alejandro Roces. According to the Master Plan of Quezon City, it was planned to stretch between New Manila and a proposed park near the present-day intersection of EDSA and Quezon Avenue at the National Government Center I. As of 2012, however, only two sampaloc trees remain, as they have been cut down over the years to make way for parking spaces.

In 1966, the avenue was renamed to honor Tomas Morato, the city's first mayor under whose term the road was constructed. By the 1990s, the street was transformed into a trendy hot spot with bars lining the street such as the popular Tia Maria's. In 1996, one of the deadliest nightclub fires occurred at the Ozone Disco Club on Tomas Morato and Timog Avenue. In 2003, the street underwent a major renovation with the sidewalk improved and railings installed along corners of the avenue to prevent double parking.

References 

Streets in Quezon City
Restaurant districts and streets in the Philippines